Johannes Reichel (born April 29, 1982) is an Austrian professional ice hockey defenceman who is currently an unrestricted free agent who last played for HK 36 Skalica in the Slovak Extraliga (Slovak). On July 17, 2015, after Captaining the club in the 2014–15 season, Reichel was re-signed to a one-year extension with EC KAC.
He participated at the 2011 IIHF World Championship as a member of the Austria men's national ice hockey team.

References

External links

1982 births
Austrian ice hockey defencemen
HK 36 Skalica players
EC KAC players
Living people
Rögle BK players
Austrian expatriate sportspeople in Slovakia
Austrian expatriate ice hockey people
Austrian expatriate sportspeople in Sweden
Expatriate ice hockey players in Sweden
Expatriate ice hockey players in Slovakia